

Race Callers
Chic Anderson (1975–1977)
Dave Johnson (1978–1980, 1984–1985, 1987–2000)
Mike Battaglia (1981–1986)
Marshall Cassidy (1986)
Tom Durkin (2006–2010)
Trevor Denman (2008–2011)

Hosts
Chris Schenkel (1975–1976)
Jim McKay (1975–2000)
Al Michaels (1986–2000)
Brent Musburger (2004–2008)
Terry Gannon (2005-2006)
Kenny Mayne (2006–2011)
Chris Fowler (2006–2007)
Joe Tessitore (2007–2011)

Analysts
John Rotz (1975)
Eddie Arcaro (1977–1981)
John M. Veitch (1982)
Bill Hartack (1983–1986)
Charlsie Cantey (1986–2000)
Steve Cauthen (1993)
Catherine Crier (2004)
Jerry Bailey (2006–2011)
Dave Johnson (1987–2000)
Nick Luck (2008–2011)
Lesley Visser (1994–2000)

Handicappers
Howard Cosell (1975–1985)
Hank Goldberg (1998–2000, 2004-2011)
Randy Moss (2006-2011)
Rick Reilly (2008–2009)
Jessica Pacheco (2008)

Reporters
Thea Andrews (2004-2006)
Howard Cosell (1975–1985)
Chris Schenkel (1978)
Jack Whitaker (1982–1995)
Frank Gifford (1983)
Lynn Swann (1986–1990)
Robin Roberts (1991–2000)
Lesley Visser (1994–2000)
Charlsie Cantey (1986–2000)
Jeannine Edwards (2006–2011)
Quint Kessenich (2006)
Jeremy Schaap (2006, 2010–2011)
Tom Rinaldi (2006–2010)
Rece Davis (2007–2009)
Caton Bredar (2007–2011)
Jay Privman (2008–2011)
Steve Cyphers (2008–2011)
Pat Forde (2008)
Bill Nack (2008–2011)
Rick Reilly (2009)
Chris Connelly (2009)

Thoroughbred racing commentators
ABC
ABC